From the lower border of the inferior nasal concha, a thin lamina, the maxillary process, curves downward and laterally; it articulates with the maxilla and forms a part of the medial wall of the maxillary sinus.

References

External links

Bones of the head and neck